Fabian Schubert (born 29 August 1994) is an Austrian professional footballer who plays as a forward for Swiss club St. Gallen.

Career
On 21 June 2019, FC Blau-Weiß Linz confirmed, that they had signed Schubert on a one-year deal.

On 18 June 2021, he joined St. Gallen in Switzerland on a two-year contract.

References

External links

1994 births
Living people
Austrian footballers
Association football forwards
SV Ried players
SK Sturm Graz players
TSV Hartberg players
FC Blau-Weiß Linz players
FC St. Gallen players
Austrian Football Bundesliga players
2. Liga (Austria) players
Austrian Regionalliga players
Swiss Super League players
Austrian expatriate footballers
Austrian expatriate sportspeople in Switzerland
Expatriate footballers in Switzerland